Vadim Zadoynov (born 24 May 1969) is a Moldovan athlete who specialized in the 400 metres hurdles.

He was born in Chişinău. He won the bronze medal for the Soviet Union at the 1988 World Junior Championships. At the 1990 European Championships he finished fourth in the 400 m hurdles and eighth in the 4 × 400 m relay. At the 1992 Olympic Games he was knocked out in the heats.

He also competed at the World Championships in 1993, 1995, 1997 and 1999, and only reached the semi-final once; in 1997. He was also knocked out in the heats at the Olympic Games in 1996 and 2000. He finished seventh at the 1994 European Championships and fifth at the 1998 European Championships.

His personal best time was 48.61 seconds, achieved at the 1990 European Championships in Split.

International competitions

References
sports-reference

1969 births
Living people
Moldovan male hurdlers
Soviet male hurdlers
Athletes (track and field) at the 1992 Summer Olympics
Olympic athletes of the Unified Team
Athletes (track and field) at the 1996 Summer Olympics
Athletes (track and field) at the 2000 Summer Olympics
Olympic athletes of Moldova
World Athletics Championships athletes for Moldova
Sportspeople from Chișinău
CIS Athletics Championships winners
Competitors at the 1990 Goodwill Games
Competitors at the 1994 Goodwill Games